Vir Sanghvi (born 5 July 1956) is an Indian print and television journalist, author, columnist and talk show host. He has been a member of many professional, academic and government bodies including the National Integration Council. Currently, he is a member of the Broadcast Content Complaint Council (BCCC), a body that regulates content on entertainment TV channels and Co-Founder/Lead Food Critic at EazyDiner.

Early life and education

Vir Sanghvi was born to Ramesh and Vimoo Sanghvi on July 9, 1956 in London. His father was a former-communist barrister turned businessman who hailed from a middle class family in Rajkot while his mother was an industrial psychologist who hailed from a wealthy textile-mill owning family from Ahmedabad comparable to the Sarabhais. 

Vir Sanghvi is an Indian editor and also a television personality. He is a Gujarati Jain. Currently, he is editorial director of the Hindustan Times. Sanghvi was brought up in Bombay (now Mumbai) and London and educated at Mayo College, Ajmer, and Mill Hill School, London. He went on to study politics, philosophy and economics at Brasenose College, Oxford on the Inlaks Scholarship.

His show Custom Made for Vir Sanghvi on NDTV Goodtimes, where he travels across India, in search of the most luxurious and bespoke 'Indian' experiences has received high ratings and been renewed for a second season. His published books include Rude Food, India – Then and Now and Men of Steel (a collection of profiles of India's leading businessmen. He has also authored a biography of the late Madhavrao Scindia, which was released by Sonia Gandhi in 2009.

Personal life
Vir married author Malavika Sanghvi. They had a son Raaj Sanghvi and  Mallika Sangghvi. Later he divorced Malavika and married Seema Goswami.

Nira Radia tapes
In 2010, Sanghvi was connected to the Nira Radia tapes.
In the audio tape Sanghvi was heard asking "What kind of story do you want?" It is alleged that he made some points suggested by Radia in his article titled 'Time for some transparency' under Sanghvi's column "Counterpoint". Sanghvi denied all allegations and uploaded the article onto his website for readers to make their own judgement. On 27 November 2010, Sanghvi released a detailed statement in the Hindustan Times, clarifying his role, and also raising the possibility of the tapes being edited. Due to the heightened interest in him Sanghvi temporarily suspended his weekly article "Counterpoint".

In January 2012, The Union Government told the Supreme Court that the Radia tapes broadcast by media organisations were tampered with and the government agencies were not responsible for its leakage.

Food critic and journalist
Vir Sanghvi writes a column, Rude Food, in the Hindustan Times Brunch magazine. Also given the “Best Food Critic” award from the Indian Culinary Foundation, Vir is the creator and host of the television shows “A Matter of Taste” and "Vir Sanghvi’s Asian Diary" on the Discovery Travel Living channel. He was also the lead judge for the television cooking competition, Foodistan. He is the co-founder and lead critic of online restaurant reservation platform, EazyDiner.

Books by Vir Sanghvi
 Men of Steel – India's business leaders in candid conversation with Vir Sanghvi, Roli Books Pvt Ltd, India (Jan 2007) 
 A Rude Life
 Rude Food: The Collected Food Writings of Vir Sanghvi, Penguin Putnam (2004) 
 India Then and Now : Now/Vir Sanghvi. New Delhi, Roli, 2006, 274 p., $120. .
 26/11:The Attack on Mumbai, Penguin, 2009, 
 Madhavrao Scindia: A life, Penguin, 2009, 
 Mandate: Will of the People, Westland, 2016, 

References

External links
 Vir Sanghvi's Website
 Vir Sangvi columns Hindustan Times''

1956 births
Living people
Indian male television journalists
Indian food writers
Indian critics
Indian columnists
Indian newspaper editors
Indian television presenters
Mayo College alumni
People educated at Mill Hill School
Alumni of Brasenose College, Oxford
Gujarati people
Indian male novelists
People from London